Philip Petermann (born 3 August 1991) is an Austrian footballer.

References

External links
 

1991 births
Living people
Austrian footballers
SV Horn players
FC Juniors OÖ players
Association football goalkeepers